Patricia Elvira Hake (born 29 January 1931), known as Elvi Hale, is a retired British actress. She played Anne of Cleves in The Six Wives of Henry VIII, broadcast in 1970.

Career 
Raised in Romford, Essex and educated at Reed's School. She was discovered by Laurence Olivier, who saw her perform at the Old Vic School. Elvi played Heather, the love interest of Leslie Phillips (as Sub-Lieutenant Pouter) in the film version of The Navy Lark (1959), a role normally played by Heather Chasen in the radio series.

Hale was nominated for a BAFTA award for most promising film newcomer for her performance in Wendy Toye's True as a Turtle (1957). She portrayed the fourth of Henry VIII's wives, Anne of Cleves, in the BBC's six-part drama serial The Six Wives of Henry VIII first broadcast in 1970. She completely retired from all film and television work in 1990.

Personal life
She was married to actor Mike Morgan until his death in 1958. She married character actor George Murcell in 1961; he died in 1998, aged 73.

Partial filmography
 True as a Turtle (1957) - Ann
 Happy Is the Bride (1958) - Petula
 The Navy Lark (1959) - Leading WREN Heather
 Man Detained (1961) - Kay Simpson
 The Heroes of Telemark (1965) - Mrs. Sandersen
 Bel Ami (1971) - Clotilde de Marelle

References

External links

1931 births
Living people
Actresses from Essex
British film actresses
British television actresses
People from Romford